is one of the Monadhliath Mountains of Scotland. It is a Munro with a height of

References

Mountains and hills of Highland (council area)
Munros